Ray Hardy Åström (born 29 March 1951 in Luleå, Sweden) is a retired Swedish professional ice hockey goaltender who played three seasons in the National Hockey League (NHL) for the New York Rangers and Colorado Rockies.

Åström was the first European goaltender to start an NHL game, when he played for the Rangers against the Montreal Canadiens on February 25, 1978. Åström played brilliantly in the Rangers' 6-3 win, which also stopped Montreal's 28-game unbeaten streak.

Hardy Åstrom also represented Sweden in the 1976 Canada Cup as one of Sweden's top goalies.

Career statistics

Regular season and playoffs

International

References

External links

1951 births
Colorado Rockies (NHL) players
Fort Worth Texans players
Living people
Modo Hockey players
New Haven Nighthawks players
New York Rangers players
Oklahoma City Stars players
People from Luleå
Skellefteå AIK players
Södertälje SK players
Swedish ice hockey goaltenders
Undrafted National Hockey League players
Sportspeople from Norrbotten County